2017 Tokushima Vortis season.

J2 League

References

External links
 J.League official site

Tokushima Vortis
Tokushima Vortis seasons